Kolonia Pęcławice  (till 31 December 2000 as at Tomtasówka-Kolonia Pęcławice) is a village in the administrative district of Gmina Bogoria, within Staszów County, Świętokrzyskie Voivodeship, in south-central Poland.

The village has a population of  142.

Demography 
According to the 2002 Poland census, there were 143 people residing in Kolonia Pęcławice village, of whom 46.9% were male and 53.1% were female. In the village, the population was spread out, with 26.6% under the age of 18, 41.3% from 18 to 44, 21.7% from 45 to 64, and 10.5% who were 65 years of age or older.

 Figure 1. Population pyramid of village in 2002 – by age group and sex

References

Villages in Staszów County